Unsettled is a 2007 documentary feature film written, directed, and produced by Adam Hootnick, depicting the experiences of six young Israeli adults taking part in the Gaza disengagement of August, 2005. Its soundtrack features Matisyahu and other Israeli and Jewish pop music, and original music by Jon Lee.

The movie had a limited theatrical release and received acclaim at numerous film festivals, such as the Florida Film Festival and the Temecula Valley International Film Festival, most notably winning the Grand Jury Prize for Best Documentary Feature at the 2007 Slamdance Film Festival.

References

External links 
 
 
Unsettled at slamdance.com

2007 films
Gaza Strip
Documentary films about the Israeli–Palestinian conflict